The final stages of the 2014 Copa Sudamericana were played from October 1 to December 10, 2014. A total of 16 teams competed in the final stages.

Draw
The draw of the tournament was held on May 20, 2014, 12:00 UTC−3, at the Sheraton Hotel in Buenos Aires, Argentina.

To determine the bracket starting from the round of 16, the defending champion and the 15 winners of the second stage were assigned a "seed" by draw. The defending champion and the winners from Argentina Zone and Brazil Zone were assigned odd-numbered "seeds", and the winners from ties between South Zone and North Zone were assigned even-numbered "seeds".

Seeding
The following were the seeding of the 16 teams which qualified for the final stages, which included the defending champion (Lanús) and the 15 winners of the second stage (three from Argentina Zone, four from Brazil Zone, eight from ties between South Zone and North Zone):

Format
In the final stages, the 16 teams played a single-elimination tournament, with the following rules:
Each tie was played on a home-and-away two-legged basis, with the higher-seeded team hosting the second leg.
In the round of 16, quarterfinals, and semifinals, if tied on aggregate, the away goals rule was used. If still tied, the penalty shoot-out was used to determine the winner (no extra time was played).
In the finals, if tied on aggregate, the away goals rule was not used, and 30 minutes of extra time was played. If still tied after extra time, the penalty shoot-out was used to determine the winner.
If there were two semifinalists from the same association, they must play each other.

Bracket
The bracket of the knockout stages was determined by the seeding as follows:
Round of 16:
Match A: Seed 1 vs. Seed 16
Match B: Seed 2 vs. Seed 15
Match C: Seed 3 vs. Seed 14
Match D: Seed 4 vs. Seed 13
Match E: Seed 5 vs. Seed 12
Match F: Seed 6 vs. Seed 11
Match G: Seed 7 vs. Seed 10
Match H: Seed 8 vs. Seed 9
Quarterfinals:
Match S1: Winner A vs. Winner H
Match S2: Winner B vs. Winner G
Match S3: Winner C vs. Winner F
Match S4: Winner D vs. Winner E
Semifinals: (if there were two semifinalists from the same association, they must play each other)
Match F1: Winner S1 vs. Winner S4
Match F2: Winner S2 vs. Winner S3
Finals: Winner F1 vs. Winner F2

Round of 16
The first legs were played on September 30, October 1 and 14–16, and the second legs were played on October 15–16 and 21–23, 2014.

|}

Match A

Atlético Nacional won 3–2 on aggregate.

Match B

Tied 1–1 on aggregate, Boca Juniors won on penalties.

Match C

River Plate won 5–1 on aggregate.

Match D

São Paulo won 4–2 on aggregate.

Match E

Tied 1–1 on aggregate, Emelec won on penalties.

Match F

Tied 3–3 on aggregate, Estudiantes won on penalties.

Match G

Cerro Porteño won 3–2 on aggregate.

Match H

Tied 2–2 on aggregate, Universidad César Vallejo won on penalties.

Quarterfinals
The first legs were played on October 29–30, and the second legs were played on November 5–6, 2014.

|}

Match S1

Atlético Nacional won 2–0 on aggregate.

Match S2

Boca Juniors won 5–1 on aggregate.

Match S3

River Plate won 5–3 on aggregate.

Match S4

São Paulo won 6–5 on aggregate.

Semifinals
The first legs were played on November 19–20, and the second legs were played on November 26–27, 2014.

|}

Match F1

Tied 1–1 on aggregate, Atlético Nacional won on penalties.

Match F2

River Plate won 1–0 on aggregate.

Finals

The finals were played on a home-and-away two-legged basis, with the higher-seeded team hosting the second leg. If tied on aggregate, the away goals rule was not used, and 30 minutes of extra time was played. If still tied after extra time, the penalty shoot-out was used to determine the winner.

The first leg was played on December 3, and the second leg was played on December 10, 2014.

River Plate won 3–1 on aggregate.

References

External links
 
Copa Sudamericana, CONMEBOL.com 

2